Wajahatullah Wasti (Urdu: وجاہت اللہ واسطی; born 11 November 1974) is a Pakistani cricketer. He is member of The National Selection Committee Pakistan Cricket Board . He is a right-handed batsman and a right-arm offbreak bowler. Wasti played in six Test matches between February 1999 and May 2000, but soon found himself out of the side after much criticism on his performance. In just his second Test, he scored 133 and 121 not out against Sri Lanka at Lahore.  His best ODI performance was a classy, stroke-filled 84 against New Zealand in the 1999 Cricket World Cup semifinal, which Pakistan won by nine wickets. Wasti took 123 balls to make that score, carving 10 boundaries and a six on the way. Wasti has not played international cricket since May 2000.

References

External links
 

1974 births
Living people
Pakistan One Day International cricketers
Pakistan Test cricketers
Allied Bank Limited cricketers
Khyber Pakhtunkhwa cricketers
Cricketers at the 1998 Commonwealth Games
Zarai Taraqiati Bank Limited cricketers
Peshawar cricketers
Peshawar Panthers cricketers
Cricketers from Peshawar
Commonwealth Games competitors for Pakistan